Military Intelligence and Security Service can refer to
 Military Intelligence and Security Service Sweden, the Swedish external intelligence agency (Militära underrättelse- och säkerhetstjänsten)
 Military Intelligence and Security Service Netherlands, the Dutch Military intelligence agency.
 Servizio per le Informazioni e la Sicurezza Militare, the military intelligence agency of Italy.